Potassium inwardly-rectifying channel, subfamily J, member 14 (KCNJ14), also known as Kir2.4, is a human gene.

Potassium channels are present in most mammalian cells, where they participate in a wide range of physiologic responses. The protein encoded by this gene is an integral membrane protein and inward-rectifier type potassium channel, and probably has a role in controlling the excitability of motor neurons. Two transcript variants encoding the same protein have been found for this gene.

See also
 Inward-rectifier potassium ion channel

References

Further reading

External links 
 

Ion channels